Complicated Game is the ninth studio album by American folk rock musician James McMurtry, released on February 24, 2015, by Complicated Game Records.

Critical reception 

According to Metacritic, Complicated Game has a score of 87 out of 100, indicating that it has received "universal acclaim" from music critics.

Track listing

Charts

References 

2015 albums
James McMurtry albums